Splanchnotrophidae is a family of cyclopoid copepods in the order Cyclopoida. There are about 7 genera and more than 30 described species in Splanchnotrophidae.

Genera
These seven genera belong to the family Splanchnotrophidae:
 Arthurius Huys, 2001
 Ceratosomicola Huys, 2001
 Ismaila Bergh, 1868
 Lomanoticola Scott & Scott, 1895
 Lomantoticola
 Majimun Uyeno & Nagasawa, 2012
 Splanchnotrophus Hancock & Norman, 1863

References

Cyclopoida
Articles created by Qbugbot
Crustacean families